Zhimomi is a Sümi Naga surname. Notable people with the surname include:

Hokaito Zhimomi, cricketer
Inakato Zhimomi, cricketer
Jacob Zhimomi, politician
H. Khekiho Zhimomi, politician
Kivi Zhimomi, footballer
Vino Zhimomi, cricketer

See also